Swapnil Asnodkar (born 29 March 1984), is an Indian first-class cricketer. He is a hard hitting right-handed opening batsman with a relatively short stature of around 5'5. He played for Goa in first class cricket, and Rajasthan Royals in the Indian Premier League.

Domestic career
He was the leading run-scorer for Goa in the 2017–18 Ranji Trophy, with 369 runs in six matches.

Indian Premier League
Playing for Rajasthan Royals, he scored 311 runs at a strike rate of 133.47.

He formed a strong opening partnership with South African captain Graeme Smith. By the end of the tournament they had scored 418 runs together at an average of 59.71 – the highest of the tournament. In the seven IPL matches he played, he scored 244 runs at 34.86 with a strike rate of 127.08. On his IPL debut against Kolkata Knight Riders, he scored 60 runs from 34 balls. His innings included 10 fours and one six with a strike rate 176.47. He bowls right-arm offbreaks. He was called up to an Indian emerging players tour to Israel in July 2008.

Coaching
In 2019, he took the charge as the coach for the Goa under 23 cricket team.

References

External links
 

Indian cricketers
Goa cricketers
South Zone cricketers
Rajasthan Royals cricketers
India Blue cricketers
People from Porvorim
Living people
1984 births
Cricketers from Goa